The Canadian Sleep Society (CSS) / Société Canadienne du Sommeil (SCS) is a professional organization with the stated aim of improving Canadians' quality of sleep. Its membership is made up of physicians, sleep researchers, polysomnographic technicians, dentists, clinical psychologists, students/trainees, and other certified allied health professionals.

Mission 
The Canadian Sleep Society describes itself as "a national organization committed to improving sleep for all
Canadians through: support for research; promotion of high quality clinical care; education
of professionals and the public; and advocacy for sleep and sleep disorders medicine."

Publications
The official newsletter of the CSS, Vigilance provides information to its membership and to the public about the activities of the society. Vigilance is typically published in electronic format biannually.

A number of educational brochures are also freely available in English and French from the CSS.

Recently, the CSS partnered with the Canadian Thoracic Society (CTS) to publish a position paper on portable monitoring for sleep apnea in the Canadian Respiratory Journal.

Meeting
The Canadian Sleep Society Congress gathers biannually to present information on sleep research and sleep medicine. Approximately 500 to 800 people attend the meeting, and is the largest of its kind in Canada entirely devoted to sleep. The meeting is composed of scientific presentations, an exhibition hall, public lectures, education courses, a technologists program and a student day.

The host cities for its past meetings were: 

To access the abstracts from past conferences, go to the CSS Past Meetings page

Past Presidents

Current Board of Directors

External links
 The Official Site of the Canadian Sleep Society
 CSS Facebook page
 CSS Twitter page
 The 2011 joint congress of the World Association of Sleep Medicine and the CSS in Quebec City, Canada, September 10-15, 2011
 The Official Site of the World Association of Sleep Medicine (WASM)
 The Official Site of The World Federation of Sleep Research & Sleep Medicine Societies (WFSRSMS)

References

Sleep medicine organizations
Medical and health organizations based in Ontario
St. Catharines